Maisons (French for "houses") is the name or part of the name of several communes in France:

 Maisons, Aude, in the Aude department
 Maisons, Calvados, in the Calvados department, Normandy
 Maisons, Eure-et-Loir, in the Eure-et-Loir department
 Maisons-Alfort, in the suburbs of Paris
 Maisons-du-Bois-Lièvremont, in the Doubs department, Bourgogne-Franche-Comté
 Maisons-en-Champagne, in the Marne department 
 Maisons-Laffitte, in the Yvelines department, Île-de-France
 Château de Maisons, a 17th-century manor house
 Maisons-lès-Chaource, in the Aube department, Grand Est
 Maisons-lès-Soulaines, in the Aube department, Grand Est

See also 
 Maisonsgoutte, in the Bas-Rhin department, Alsace, France
 Maison (disambiguation)